The 1982–83 FIBA Korać Cup was the 12th edition of FIBA's Korać Cup basketball competition. The French Limoges CSP defeated the Yugoslav Šibenka in the final on March 8, 1983 in West Berlin, Germany. The final was a rematch of the previous year's, with Limoges CSP achieving its second consecutive victory.

First round

|}

*Miñón Valladolid withdrew before the first leg due to financial problems, and Nyon received a forfeit (2–0) in both games.

Second round

|}

Automatically qualified to round of 16
  Limoges CSP (title holder)
  Šibenka
  Joventut Fichet
  Binova Cucine Rieti
  Partizan
  Dynamo Moscow

Round of 16

Semi finals

|}

Final
March 8, Deutschlandhalle, West Berlin

|}
Šibenka: Dražen Petrović 12, Zečević 8, Fabjan Žurić, Živko Ljubojević 30, Sreten Đurić, Branko Macura 8, Željko Marelja, Predrag Šarić 24, Srećko Jarić 4, Nenad Slavica.
Limoges: Didier Rose, Jean-Michel Senegal 5, Glenn Mosley 17, Richard Dacoury 18, Ed Murphy 34, Didier Dobbels 4, Apollo Faye 16, Hugues Occansey, Eric Narbonne, Jean-Luc Deganis.

External links
 1982–83 FIBA Korać Cup @ linguasport.com
1982–83 FIBA Korać Cup
 Report from final match in Slobodna Dalmacija archive

1982–83
1982–83 in European basketball